Germán Enrique Centeno Reneau, known as “Quique” Renau (9 April 1971 – 23 August 2015) was a Honduran football player.

Club career
A lightning fast striker and nicknamed El Esquilete (the Stilletto) or La Gacela (the Gazelle), Reneau started his career at Victoria where he debuted in 1989. He went on to score 37 goals with Victoria between 1990 and 1996, as well in 2000. At Victoria he was an important member of their first league title-winning team in 1995 when scoring the goal that won them the championship against Olimpia in Tegucigalpa.

Later he played for Marathón, Olimpia, Real España and Vida, winning the 1999 Apertura with Olimpia and the 2002 Clausura with Marathón. From 1990 to 2004, Reneau scored 59 goals in total in the Liga Nacional. In the 2001 Apertura he was the league's top goalscorer with 8 goals. He was never sent off in his career.

Spells abroad
He also had a stint in Peru with Sipesa and in El Salvador with Cojutepeque and Luis Ángel Firpo whom he left for Mexican side Cruz Azul Hidalgo. He returned to El Salvador in August 2005 to play for Chalatenango.

He finished his career at Guatemalan side Mictlán with whom he won promotion to the Guatemalan top tier in summer 2006.

International career
Reneau made his debut for Honduras in a January 1996 CONCACAF Gold Cup match against Brazil and has earned a total of 16 caps, scoring 5 goals. He has represented his country in 5 FIFA World Cup qualification matches and played at the 1997 UNCAF Nations Cup, as well as at the 1996 CONCACAF Gold Cup.

His final international was an April 1997 UNCAF Nations Cup match against Panama.

International goals
Scores and results list Honduras' goal tally first.

Retirement, personal life and death
His parents were Óscar Centeno and María Carolina Reneau. He met his Salvadoran girlfriend Brenda Ramírez in 1996, when he played for Firpo. Reneau has three children: Melissa, Karen and Enrique. After retiring in 2006 he moved to New Orleans and then Miami in the United States where he painted buildings.

In July 2013, Reneau was diagnosed with motor neurone disease. He subsequently lost his job in the US and returned to Honduras in December 2013. He died on 23 August 2015 in a La Ceiba's Vicente Dantoni hospital due to respiratory failure.

Honours and awards
C.D. Olimpia
Liga Profesional de Honduras (1): 1998–99
C.D. Victoria
Liga Profesional de Honduras (1): 1994–95
C.D. Marathón
Liga Profesional de Honduras (1): 2001–02 C
Real C.D. España
Liga Profesional de Honduras (1): 2003–04 A

References

External links

1971 births
2015 deaths
People from Jutiapa Department
Association football forwards
Honduran footballers
Honduras international footballers
1996 CONCACAF Gold Cup players
C.D. Victoria players
Deportivo Sipesa footballers
C.D. Luis Ángel Firpo footballers
C.D. Marathón players
C.D. Olimpia players
Deportivo Zacapa players
Real C.D. España players
C.D.S. Vida players
C.D. Chalatenango footballers
Liga Nacional de Fútbol Profesional de Honduras players
Honduran expatriate footballers
Honduran expatriate sportspeople in Mexico
Honduran expatriate sportspeople in Guatemala
Expatriate footballers in El Salvador
Expatriate footballers in Peru
Expatriate footballers in Mexico
Expatriate footballers in Guatemala
Neurological disease deaths in Honduras
Deaths from motor neuron disease